Vilmos is a masculine given name, the Hungarian form of the Germanic Wilhelm gained through the Latin Vilhelmus.

People named Vilmos

In sport 

 Vilmos Szabó (1964-), Hungarian fencer
 Vilmos Orbán (1992-), Hungarian footballer
 Vilmos Vanczák (1983-), Hungarian footballer
 Vilmos Göttler (1951-), Hungarian equestrian
 Vilmos Sebők (1973-), Hungarian footballer
 Vilmos Tölgyesi (1931-1970), Hungarian runner
 Vilmos Galló (1996-), Hungarian ice hockey player
 Vilmos Földes (1984-), Hungarian pool player
 Vilmos Énekes (1915-1990), Hungarian boxer
 Vilmos Kohut (1906-1986), Hungarian footballer
 Vilmos Radasics (1983-), Hungarian BMX racer
 Vilmos Iváncsó (1939-1997), Hungarian volleyball player
 Vilmos Jakab (1952-), Hungarian boxer
 Vilmos Telinger (1950-2013), Hungarian footballer
 Vilmos Zombori (1906-1993), Hungarian footballer
 Vilmos Lóczi (1925-1991), Hungarian basketball player
 Vilmos Varjú (1937-1994), Hungarian shot putter

In art 

 Vilmos Aba-Novák (1894-1941), Hungarian painter
 Vilmos Huszár (1884-1960), Hungarian painter

In politics 

 Vilmos Patay (1953-), Hungarian politician
 Vilmos Böhm (1880-1949), Hungarian politician
 Vilmos Tkálecz (1894-1950), Slovenian politician
 Vilmos Hellebronth (1895-1971), Hungarian politician
 Vilmos Szabó (1952-), Hungarian politician

In music 

 Vilmos Tátrai (1912-1999), Hungarian violinist
 Vilmos Gryllus (1951-), Hungarian musician

Other 

 Vilmos Freund (1846-1920), Hungarian architect
 Vilmos Zsigmond (1930-2016), Hungarian cinematographer
 Vilmos Fraknói (1843-1924), Hungarian historian
 Vilmos Zsolnay (1828-1900), Hungarian entrepreneur
 Vilmos Apor (1892-1945), Hungarian bishop
 Vilmos Totik (1954-), Hungarian mathematician
 Vilmos Tartsay (1901-1944), Hungarian commander

References 

Hungarian masculine given names
Masculine given names